Asbury College was a former Methodist college in Baltimore, Maryland.  It was founded in 1816 about 20 years after Cookesbury College, the only other Methodist college that had existed in the United States up until that time, had burned down.

Asbury College obtained a license to operate from Maryland in 1818.  The first president was Samuel K. Jennings.  Jennings was a graduate of Rutgers College and had studied medicine with his father, Jacob Jennings.  Besides Jennings who besides being president held the position of professor of mental and moral science there were four other professors.  The college was still functioning in 1832 but closed not long after that.

References 

Defunct private universities and colleges in Maryland
Educational institutions established in 1816
1816 establishments in Maryland
Methodism in Maryland
Universities and colleges in Baltimore